Kaoru Matsubara may refer to:

Kaoru Matsubara (athlete) (born 1960), Japanese Olympic sprinter
Buttercup (Kaoru Matsubara), a protagonist from the anime series Powerpuff Girls Z